Rupert Hordern Myer  (born 13 August 1958) is an Australian businessman and philanthropist. He is a member of the Myer family, which, in 2014, was the sixth wealthiest family in Australia, with a net worth of more than $2 billion in properties and a diversified investment portfolio. The largest investment portfolio is managed by The Myer Family Company, where Rupert Myer was chairman until 2012.

Myer's grandfather, Sidney Myer, was the founder of Myer, the largest department store company in Australia, and his father, Baillieu Myer, also served as company chairman. He serves as a director on the boards of Amcil, Ecargo and Healthscope. Myer is a supporter of the arts, and has served as chairman of both the Australia Council for the Arts and the National Gallery of Australia.

Education
Myer attended Trinity College while studying at the University of Melbourne, from which he graduated with a Bachelor of Commerce (Honours) degree. He subsequently gained a Master of Arts from the University of Cambridge and is a fellow of the Australian Institute of Company Directors.

Arts and philanthropy 
He serves as a member of the Felton Bequests’ Committee and as a board member of Jawun – Indigenous Corporate Partnerships, Creative Partnerships Australia, The Myer Foundation, The Australian International Cultural Foundation and The University of Melbourne Faculty of Business and Economics Advisory Board. He is also an emeritus trustee of The National Gallery of Victoria.

Myer chaired the Australian Government’s Inquiry into the Contemporary Visual Arts and Crafts Sector which completed its report in 2002.

Myer was the chair of The Australia Council for the Arts from 2012 until 2018 . His previous roles in the arts include serving as chairman of the National Gallery of Australia, Opera Australia, Capital Fund, Kaldor Public Art Projects and National Gallery of Victoria Foundation and as a trustee, National Gallery of Victoria, a board member, Museum of Contemporary Art, Sydney, a member of the advisory board, Melbourne Symphony Orchestra, a member, National Council & Melbourne Committee, The Australian Opera (now Opera Australia), and as a council member, Australian Association of Philanthropy (now Philanthropy Australia).  He served on the board of Myer from when it was separated from Coles Myer Limited in 2006 until 2015.

Awards and honours
Myer became a member of the Order of Australia in January 2005 for service to the arts, for support of museums, galleries, and the community through a range of philanthropic and service organisations. He was made an officer of the Order of Australia in 2015.

References

1958 births
Living people
Australian people of Belarusian-Jewish descent
Businesspeople from Melbourne
Alumni of the University of Cambridge
Officers of the Order of Australia
20th-century Australian businesspeople
Fellows of the Australian Institute of Company Directors
People educated at Trinity College (University of Melbourne)
Myer family